Arnold II of Laurenburg,  (died 1158/59) was count of Laurenburg and one of the ancestors of the House of Nassau.

Life 

Arnold was a son of count Rupert I of Laurenburg and Beatrix of Limburg, a daughter of Walram II ‘the Pagan’, Count of Limburg and Duke of Lower Lorraine, and Jutta of Guelders (daughter of count Gerard I of Guelders). His parentage is confirmed by the charter dated 1151 under which Henry II of Leez, Bishop of Liège, confirmed the donations by ‘domina Jutta, nobilissima matrona uxor ducis Walrami de Lemburg’ to Rolduc Abbey, which records the presence at her burial in Rolduc of ‘… Arnoldus quoque filius Ruberti comitis de Lunneburg natus ex domina Beatrice filia præfatæ dominæ …’.

Arnold is mentioned as count of Laurenburg between 1151 and 1158. He ruled together with his brother Rupert II. Arnold and Rupert were, together with their mother, last mentioned in a charter dated 1 April 1158.

Uncertainty about wife and children 
Due to the lack of data, there is much unknown about the early counts of Laurenburg and Nassau, including the exact family relationships. No marriage has been mentioned of Arnold. He is supposed to be the father of count Rupert III of Nassau.

Sources 
 This article was translated from the corresponding Dutch Wikipedia article, as of 2018-08-25.

References

External links 
 Family tree of the early House of Nassau.
 Nassau in: Medieval Lands. A prosopography of medieval European noble and royal families

House of Nassau
12th-century people of the Holy Roman Empire
Year of birth unknown
Year of death uncertain

1150s deaths